is a Japanese track and field athlete who specialises in the 100 metres hurdles. Her personal best for the event is 13.08 seconds.

Her greatest achievement was a gold medal at the 2007 Asian Athletics Championships. She also represented her country at the 2007 World Championships in Athletics, held in Osaka that year. She was the silver medalist at the 2009 East Asian Games. Ishino won national titles in the hurdles in 2006 and 2007.

Career
Born in Chiba Prefecture, she attended high school in Otaki before gaining a degree from the Japan Women's College of Physical Education. After graduation she signed up with the Hasegawa Corporation track team. Her breakthrough year came in 2004, when she placed fourth in the 100 m hurdles at the Japan Championships in Athletics, won the Japan universities title, then set a personal best of 13.44 seconds to win at the National Sports Festival of Japan. She defended her national games title the following year. That year she had runner-up placings at the Japanese Championships and the Japan Corporate Track and Field Championships, improving her best to 13.33 seconds at the latter competition. Her international debut came at the 2005 Asian Athletics Championships and she finished just two hundredths behind bronze medallist and fellow Japanese Kumiko Imura. A run of 13.08 seconds in Odawara brought her to third on the all-time Japanese lists.

She secured her first national title in 2006 and was also runner-up at the Corporate Championships and Japanese Games. Ishino won a second, consecutive national title the following year and also topped the podium at the 2007 Asian Athletics Championships with her time of  13.26 seconds. She won the titles at the corporate meet and the National Games as well. She made her global debut at the 2007 World Championships, but did not get past the heats stage.

In 2008, she found herself finishing behind teenager Asuka Terada at both the national championships and the national games. She opened 2009 with a win at the Oda Memorial. She again was beaten by Terada at two competitions, coming second in the Japanese championship and missing the medals at the 2009 Asian Athletics Championships (Terada was runner-up). Ishino did manage to win at the Japanese Games and Corporate championships that year. She was the silver medallist behind Sun Yawei at the 2009 East Asian Games in December.

Ishino retained her corporate title in 2010, but was third at the Japanese Championships and Games and did not compete internationally. For the first since 2004, Ishino failed to reach the top three at the 2011 Japan Championships in Athletics and also had to settle for third at the corporate meet and the Japanese Games. Her form continued to diminish in 2012 and 2013, as she failed even to reach the national finals in the 100 m hurdles.

International competition

National titles
Japanese Athletics Championships
100 m hurdles: 2006, 2007

References

External links

Mami Ishino at Japan Association of Athletics Federations 
Mami Ishino at TBS  (archived)
Mami Ishino at Hasegawa Sports Facilities Co.,Ltd.  (archived)

Living people
1983 births
Sportspeople from Chiba Prefecture
Japanese female hurdlers
World Athletics Championships athletes for Japan
Japan Championships in Athletics winners
20th-century Japanese women
21st-century Japanese women